Garra  is a village in Balaghat District of India, with a population of 4,097 (as of 2011 census).

Geography 
The village is located 4.5 km east of the city of Balaghat, on the banks of the Wainganga river.

Amenities 
The Garra Botanical Garden is a popular tourist attraction.

Transport 
The Garra Railway Station serves the diesel multiple unit (DEMU) train, which travels between Katangi and Gondia.

Culture 
Poha, or "Garra-Poha", is a local dish made from flattened rice,

Economy 
It has substantial textile makers.

Leaders 
Garra's progression from a traditional village to a more developed area is largely credited to Dharmendra Trivedi (पप्पू त्रिवेदी), now known as the son of Garra Pappu. Trivedi spent his whole life developing the village. He managed the panchayat for 25 years.

The first woman sarpanch (head of village) of gram Garra is Reena Devendra Trivedi, another member of the Trivedi family.

References

 Villages in Balaghat district